Shana M. Broussard is an American attorney who served as the chair of the Federal Election Commission (FEC) for 2021. She has been a Democratic member of the FEC since  December 15, 2020.

Early life and education 

Broussard was born on the Vandenberg Air Force Base in Santa Barbara, California, and raised in Louisiana. She earned a Bachelor of Arts degree from Dillard University and a Juris Doctor from Southern University Law Center.

Career 

Broussard served as a New Orleans Assistant District Attorney, and later as an Attorney Advisor at the Internal Revenue Service and a Deputy Disciplinary Counsel at the Louisiana Attorney Disciplinary Board. She served as the counsel to FEC Commissioner Steven T. Walther.

Federal Election Commission 

On October 28, 2020, President Donald Trump announced his intent to nominate Broussard to serve as a Commissioner of the Federal Election Commission, the first Black commissioner of the FEC, to fill the vacancy created by the resignation of Ann Ravel on March 1, 2017. Her nomination was sent to the Senate on October 30, 2020, and she was confirmed by the Senate by a vote of 92–4 on December 9, 2020, She was sworn in on December 15, 2020, with her term as Commissioner of the FEC expiring on April 30, 2023. On December 22, 2020, she was elected chair for the 2021 year.

References 

Living people
Year of birth missing (living people)
20th-century American lawyers
20th-century American women lawyers
21st-century American lawyers
21st-century American women lawyers
African-American lawyers
Dillard University alumni
District attorneys in Louisiana
Louisiana Democrats
Louisiana lawyers
Members of the Federal Election Commission
People from Santa Barbara, California
Southern University Law Center alumni
20th-century African-American women
20th-century African-American people
21st-century African-American women
21st-century African-American people